Caloptilia alnicolella is a moth of the family Gracillariidae. It is known from Quebec and the United States (Colorado and Maine).

The larvae feed on Alnus species. They mine the leaves of their host plant. The mine starts as a small, tentiform mine on the underside of the leaf. Later, the tip of a leaf is rolled downward.

References

alnicolella
Moths of North America
Moths described in 1875